Huang Kuang-nan is a Taiwanese educator and politician. He was a Minister without Portfolio in the Executive Yuan from 2012 to 2014.

Education
Huang obtained his bachelor's degree in Chinese literature from National Kaohsiung Normal University in 1981. He then graduated with a master's degree from the Graduate Institute of Fine Arts of National Taiwan Normal University in 1985 and a doctoral degree in Chinese literature from the same university in 1993.

Early career
Huang was a teacher of Kaohsiung Municipal Dingjin Elementary School from 1963 to 1966 and of Kaohsiung Municipal Shou Shan Junior High School in 1970–1971. He then served as a teaching assistant, lecturer and associate professor at Taiwan Provincial Pingtung Junior Teacher's College from 1972 to 1985. He later became an adjunct professor of the Graduate Institute of Fine Arts at National Taiwan Normal University in 1993, serving there until 2011.

References

Political office-holders in the Republic of China on Taiwan
Living people
National Kaohsiung Normal University alumni
National Taiwan Normal University alumni
Year of birth missing (living people)
Directors of museums in Taiwan